Tanja Becker-Bender (born 11 February 1978) is a German violinist. She lives in Berlin and Hamburg.

Musical career 
Born in Stuttgart, Becker-Bender has performed since age of eleven as a soloist on international stages under the baton of  Kurt Masur, Gerd Albrecht, Hubert Soudant and Fabio Luisi with renowned orchestras, such as the Stuttgart Radio Symphony Orchestra, the Berlin Konzerthaus Orchestra, the Jerusalem Symphony Orchestra, the Orchestre de la Suisse Romande and the Tokyo Philharmonic Orchestra. As a chamber musician she appeared in festivals together with Gidon Kremer, Yuri Bashmet, Boris Pergamenschikow and Arnold Steinhardt.

Becker-Bender won prizes and awards in national and international competitions such as in Geneva (Switzerland, CIEM), Tokyo (Bunkamura Orchard Hall Award), Belgium (Concours International de Musique de Chimay), Gorizia (Italy, Premio Rodolfo Lipizer), Genoa (Italy, Premio Nicolò Paganini), Greensboro (North Carolina, Eastern Music Festival) and in Houston (Texas, Houston Symphony League Award).

Education 
She received her instrumental education by Helmut Zehetmair at the Mozarteum University of Salzburg, Wolfgang Marschner in Freiburg, Wilhelm Melcher in Stuttgart, by David Takeno at the Guildhall School of Music and Drama in London and Günter Pichler at the University of Music and Performing Arts in Vienna. She completed her studies by the Master of Music and the Artist Diploma with Robert Mann at the Juilliard School in New York.

Academic career 
Becker-Bender was director in the violin program of the European American Musical Alliance (EAMA) 2004 and 2005 in Paris.

In 2006, Becker-Bender was appointed Professor of Violin at the University of Music Saar in Saarbrücken, Germany, succeeding Maxim Vengerov. In spring 2009, she received an appointment for a professorship at the University of Music and Theater Hamburg and another such appointment at the University of Music and Performing Arts in Vienna. She started her teaching activity as professor of Violin at the University of Music and Theater Hamburg in winter term 2009/2010. In 2011, she was elected for a member of the Freie Akademie der Künste Hamburg.

Discography 
 Dvořák: Works for violin and piano, Pavane, Belgium, ADW 7418 (1999)
 Albinoni: Concertos for violin, Brilliant Classics, Netherlands, 92791 (2005) – CD Nr. 3
 Beethoven: Piano trio, vol. 1 (with Melcher-Trio), ARS Production, Germany, ARS 38 467 (2007)
 Paganini: 24 Caprices for Solo Violin, Hyperion, London, CDA 67763 (2009) – "Editor's Choice" award by the English Classical Music Magazine Gramophone and Classic FM
 Jean Perrin (1920–1988): Violin Concerto (1983), DIVOX Excellence, Germany, CDX 209066 (2010)
 Erwin Schulhoff (1894–1942): Works for violin and piano, Hyperion, London, CDA 67833 (February 2011) – "Disc of the Month" by the BBC Music Magazine March 2011
 Max Reger (1873–1916), Violin Concerto in A major, Op 101, and Two Romances for violin and small orchestra, Op 50 – "International Record Review 'Outstanding' Award" (February 2012)  
 Ottorino Respighi (1879–1936), Violin Sonatas  & Pieces 
 Paul Hindemith (1895–1963): Violin Sonatas et al., Hyperion, London CDA 68014 (November 2013)  
 Ferruccio Busoni (1866–1924): Violin Concerto in D major, Op 35a, and (arr.) Benedictus from Missa Solemnis, Op 123, by L.v. Beethoven, (first recording) – Richard Strauss (1864–1949): Violin Concerto in D minor, Op 8, Hyperion, London, CDA 68044 (August 2014), Longlist 4/2014 "Preis der deutschen Schallplattenkritik" 
 Béla Bartók (1881–1945): The complete Works for Violin and Piano, Sonata for Violin solo, Piano Sonata, SWR>>music Stuttgart, Germany – Naxos Germany (2 CDs), CD-No. SWR 19003 CD (January 2016), Longlist 2/2016 "Preis der deutschen Schallplattenkritik"

References

External links 
 
 Tanja Becker-Bender: Profile of a Violin Soloist 
 Live-Concert Tanja Becker-Bender at the North German Broadcast (NDR) Hamburg (January 2012)  

1978 births
Living people
German classical violinists
Academic staff of the Hochschule für Musik Saar
21st-century classical violinists
Women classical violinists